The 1931 Liverpool Wavertree by-election was a parliamentary by-election held in England for the House of Commons constituency of Liverpool Wavertree on 23 June 1931.  It was won by the Conservative Party candidate Ronald Nall-Cain.

Vacancy 
The seat had become vacant when the sitting Conservative Member of Parliament (MP), John Tinne had resigned his seat on 3 June 1931. Tinne had held the seat since the 1924 general election.

Candidates 
The Conservative candidate was Ronald Nall-Cain, a wealthy barrister and a Hertfordshire County Councillor, while the Labour Party selected S.L. Treleaven. Neither candidate had previously stood for Parliament.

Result 
The Liberal candidate had won nearly 30% of the vote at the 1929 general election, but the party did not contest the by-election. Most of the Liberal vote went to the Conservatives, and on a reduced turnout Nall-Cain held the seat with a massively increased majority.

Nall-Cain was re-elected at the general election in October 1931, and  held the seat until the death in late 1934 of his father Charles, whom he succeeded as Baron Brocket, triggering another by-election.

Votes

See also
Liverpool Wavertree (UK Parliament constituency)
1935 Liverpool Wavertree by-election
List of United Kingdom by-elections

Sources 

Wavertree, 1931
Liverpool Wavertree by-election
Liverpool Wavertree by-election
1930s in Liverpool
Liverpool Wavertree by-election